Ronald William Sharp   (8 August 1929 –  21 July 2021) was an Australian organ builder. He was awarded the Silver Jubilee Medal (1977) and the British Empire Medal (1980). 

Sharp was self-taught and built his first organ in 1960. He specialised in mechanical, tracker action instruments, and was responsible for re-introducing mechanical action to Australia after it had been out of fashion for many years due to the convenience of electrical action. His tracker action baroque organs are particularly famous. Although sometimes criticised as having a unique and characteristic tonal design, rather than an authentic "organ" tone, this tone has come to be much appreciated by some authorities and players.

Notable organs

Sydney Opera House Grand Organbelieved to be the largest mechanical-action organ in the world. It boasts a grand 5 manuals and 131 speaking stops, 4 stops more than Sydney's other notably large organ, in Sydney Town Hall. The four largest pipes of the Prinzipal 32' hang on the rear wall and weigh an additional 6 tonnes. Its format, such as the stop and manual names, like most of his other constructions, are German in nature. Sharp was recommended to be the organ builder for this job by the English organist and organ consultant, Peter Hurford. Hurford's admiration for him had been won by the construction of the Knox Grammar School's organ on which Hurford had made a recording. Many people doubted that such a huge pipe organ, as proposed by Sharp, particularly one using mechanical key action, could be built by him – or anybody. Controversy raged throughout the construction years, until finally Sharp’s magnum opus was completed, at a cost of A$1.2 million, under the supervision of the NSW Department of Public Works, which was also responsible for supervising construction of the Sydney Opera House. The Department handed over the completed instrument to the Opera House Trust on 30 May 1979 and the opening recital was on 7 June 1979.
Knox Grammar School organlocated within the War Memorial Chapel. Well known throughout Australia and the world by its many recordings some of which, as mentioned above, performed by English Organist Peter Hurford. This instrument has the distinction of being the first major modern mechanical action organ in the country. It is a Classical style organ, with 3 manuals, 31 speaking stops, 1 coupler, opened in 1965.
Ormond College Organaltered from his design in 1992 and no longer regarded as an authentic Sharp.
Perth Concert Hall organopened in January 1973 along with the Concert Hall however at the time only the front pipes had been installed. It possesses mechanical key action and electric stop action. It contains 3000 pipes of which 66 are visible from the auditorium. It is regarded as his second-largest concert organ after the Sydney Opera House.
St Mary's Cathedral, Sydney organlocated in the triforium above the chancel intended as a two manual sixteen stop choir organ but never completed. Construction began in 1960 and was discontinued in 1971 with only two pedal stops (16' and 4') and fourteen manual stops installed. The current choir organ was completed by Orgues Létourneau in 1999 and is located in the Western Transept Gallery. It has 3 manuals and 46 speaking stops. Whilst it was made by French organ builders it was designated by the Organist at that time, Peter Kneeshaw, to be an English style organ suitable for accompanying the choir. Whereas the Whitehouse organ in the Southern Gallery was intended to be replaced with a much larger French style organ containing many more speaking stops for the solo recitals. This organ, however, was not installed in the end as the original intent was, due to unforeseeable complications. In spite of this, the choir organ is still quite an impressive instrument in its own right and is quite suitable for teaching lessons and small recitals on top of accompanying the choir. This was his first commission as an organ builder.
A small practice organ in the home of Norman Johnston, 1964.
Wollongong Town Halla notable instrument within the Australian Orgelbewegung. It, alongside the Knox Grammar School organ and the King's School in Parramatta, stand as a turning point for the movement. It was a great success by Ronald Sharp. Unlike many Continental and North American Organ builders at the time, who were producing organs often of an excessively shrill tone colour, Sharp was able to impart a singing and refined tone to this and many other magnificent instruments that he built. It possesses two manuals and pedal with mechanical action with 22 speaking stops and completed in 1968.
St John the Baptist Church, Reida two manual and pedal mechanical action organ. Its case, a joy to behold, is constructed from Western Australian jarrah, and the front burnished pipes are 75% tin. St John's is Canberra's oldest church. In addition to this, this organ was Ronald Sharp's last major instrument.
Canberra School of Musica one-manual seven stop portable organ.

References

Australian pipe organ builders
1929 births
2021 deaths
Recipients of the British Empire Medal
People from Sydney